Soundbeam is an interactive MIDI hardware and software system developed by The Soundbeam Project / EMS in which movement within a series of ultrasonic beams is used to control multimedia hardware and software.

System 
Soundbeam uses a combination of ultrasound (sonar) and tangible (foot controller) inputs to generate MIDI messages.  The sonar uses 50 kHz signals.

The latest version SOUNDBEAM 6 incorporates many of the features of both soundbeam 2 - 5. It has a full touchscreen interface, inbuilt sampling, inbuilt high quality sounds, inbuilt mini keyboard - it comes with a wide and varied sample / sound library and with 37 preset soundsets for immediate musical composition and performance. It now also includes film that is embedded with each Soundset and you can also add your own film. The film is triggered by the switches.

Version history

Implementation 
Originally designed by Edward Williams for the production of avant-garde dance music, Soundbeam has been used primarily in the field of special needs education due to the minimal physical movement required for its operation. David Jackson's Tonewall project has utilized Soundbeam since 1992.

Due to the system's ability for expansion with four sensors and eight switches, installations have included DAW synchronization (such as with Reason or Ableton), as well as live video manipulation.

References

External links 
 

Music hardware
Music therapy